Henry Harpur may refer to:

Sir Henry Harpur, 1st Baronet (1585–1638), of the Harpur-Crewe baronets
Sir Henry Harpur, 5th Baronet (1708–1748), for Worcester 1744–47, and for Tamworth 1747–48
Sir Henry Harpur, 6th Baronet  (1739–1789), MP for Derbyshire 1761–68
 Sir Henry Crewe, 7th Baronet (1763–1819), born Henry Harpur
Henry Harpur Crewe (1828–1883), an English clergyman and naturalist

See also
Henry Harper (disambiguation)
Harpur (surname)